Vincas is a Lithuanian masculine given name.

People named Vincas include:
Vincas Grybas (1890–1941), Lithuanian sculptor 
Vincas Kudirka (1858-1899),  Lithuanian poet and physician, author of the Lithuanian National Anthem
Vincas Mykolaitis-Putinas (1893–1967), Lithuanian writer
Vincas Krėvė-Mickevičius (1882–1954), Lithuanian writer, poet, novelist, playwright and philologist 
Vincas Mickevičius-Kapsukas (1880–1935), Lithuanian communist activist
Vincas Ramutis Gudaitis (born 1941), Lithuanian politician 
Justas Vincas Paleckis (born 1942), Lithuanian ex-communist and politician

Lithuanian masculine given names